Farewell Baghdad (lit. The Dove Flyer) is an Israeli film based on the novel with the same name, by Iraqi-born Jewish writer Eli Amir. The film was directed by Nissim Dayan, who also wrote the screenplay. The idea for the film was conceived by actress Ahuva Keren, and the script was translated by her into Judeo-Arabic. The making of the film was completed in 2013, but the film itself was commercially released in April 2014.

Over nearly two hours, and through the story of a 16-year-old Jewish boy, Farewell Baghdad depicts the story of the last days of the Baghdad Jewish community of the 1950s, and on the eve of the Aliyah of almost all of that community to Israel in Operation Ezra and Nehemiah. At that time, The Kingdom of Iraq was struggling to overcome its defeat in the 1948 Arab–Israeli War against the nascent State of Israel, and was torn between Royalism, separatism and communism. On the other hand, the world's oldest Jewish community, which numbered at the time about a sixth of the population of the capital of Baghdad, also grappled between their historical and cultural relationship with the Iraqi people, the growing support for the communist movement, and their solidarity with the State of Israel and Zionism.

Farewell Baghdad is the first Judeo-Arabic-language film in the history of cinema (specifically, Baghdad Jewish Arabic), and as traditionally is with the Jews of Iraq, it is inserted with phrases from the scriptures (such as "Bar Minan", "Tisha B'Av" etc.) in their traditional Iraqi Hebrew pronunciations. When the Jewish characters talk with Arab Muslims, the dialect changes slightly and becomes a Muslim Iraqi Arabic.

External links

References

2013 films
2010s historical drama films
Films based on Israeli novels
Israeli historical drama films
2010s Arabic-language films
Jewish Iraqi history
Films set in Baghdad